The Weights and Measures Act (R.S. 1985) (long title: An Act respecting weights and measures) is a Canadian law governing the units of measurements used in Canada.

Originally passed in 1970 as part of the Government of Canada's plan for metrication of Canada from Imperial measures, it was stopped in 1985 and changes were made to the act. The Metric Commission was created by the act and abolished in 1985.

The act sets forth the regulation of measurements and the commerce conducted using measuring devices.  The act provides that the International System of measurement be used with what the act calls "Customary units used with the international system" such as hour, minutes, litres, hectares, tonne or metric ton.

In addition, the act allows usage of what it labels as "Canadian units" (the imperial system), such as miles, inches, imperial gallons, and acres.  In SCHEDULE III - section 5, the act also provides for the usage of certain French units in what it labels as UNITS OF MEASUREMENT TO DESCRIBE CERTAIN LAND IN QUEBEC.  The five permitted old French units are the foot (the French foot of 12.789 inches), arpent (for both length and area), and perch (for both length and area).

Units (Schedule II)

Length

Area

Volume

Mass

Quebec land measure (Schedule III)

See also
 Measurement Canada
 Measurement Information Division of Industry Canada
 Metric system
 Metrication Ordinance 
 Units of measurement in France before the French Revolution
 Weights and Measures Act

References

 Weights and Measures Act

Canadian federal legislation
Metrication in Canada
1970 in Canadian law